Alenquer (Santo Estêvão e Triana) is a civil parish in the municipality of Alenquer, Portugal. It was formed in 2013 by the merger of the former parishes Santo Estêvão (Alenquer) and Triana (Alenquer). The population in 2011 was 10,821, in an area of 50.08 km².

References

Parishes of Alenquer, Portugal